Manuel Mota may refer to:
 Manuel Mota (guitarist) (born 1970), jazz and blues guitarist
 Manuel Mota (fashion designer) (1966–2013), Spanish fashion designer
 Manny Mota (Manuel Rafael Mota Geronimo, born 1938), baseball player